Carl Robert Katter (born 12 January 1978) is a member of the Australian Labor Party (ALP) and was that party's candidate for the seat of Higgins for the 2016 federal election. Katter is also known for having been involved in the push for LGBT rights during his political career.

Early years and background
Carl Katter was born in Brisbane, Queensland, and grew up in the north of the state including Charters Towers. His parents were federal MP Bob Katter Sr. and Joy Katter, and he is a member of a pioneering Queensland family. Katter came out as gay at the age of 18. Growing up gay in rural North Queensland, he felt he often experienced negative attitudes from some of those in his community that existed towards gay people at the time.

Bob Katter Sr, Carl's father, who died when Carl was 12 years old, was a member of the Australian Parliament representing the federal electorate of Kennedy. The younger Katter was heavily influenced by his father's labour and trade unionist politics, and by his father's belief in equality for people of all races.

Activism
In August 2011, Bob Katter Jr, Katter's half-brother and member of Parliament representing the seat of Kennedy, like his father before him, appeared at a right wing Christian rally at the Great Hall in Parliament House and decried same-sex marriage. Carl reportedly watched on television as his half-brother mocked same-sex marriage and suggested that it "deserves to be laughed at and ridiculed."

Deciding publicly to come out regarding his own homosexuality, Katter joined the push for the legalisation of same-sex marriage in Australia. He approached GetUp!, an independent Australian grass-roots community advocacy organisation, and with their help produced an online video message to counter his brother's comments. In a television interview with George Negus, Katter criticized his brother's remarks, saying that "it's hurtful, it's dangerous, and it's really inappropriate."

Katter has stated that he believes that it is better to combat his brother's views and educate rather than attack his brother on a personal level. He holds the work that his brother has done for the Kennedy electorate and elsewhere in high regard.

Recognition 
In 2011, Katter was included in The Age’s'' Top 100 most influential Melburnians.

Engagement 
Katter was a guest speaker at the Metropolitan Community Church's 2011 annual Christmas event, hosted by Justice Michael Kirby, where he gave a speech about marriage equality.

Political career
Katter was the Labor candidate for Higgins for the 2016 Federal Election. He won 15% of the vote.

References

1978 births
Australian people of Irish descent
Australian people of Lebanese descent
Gay politicians
Australian LGBT politicians
Australian LGBT rights activists
People from Brisbane
People from Melbourne
People from Mount Isa
Living people
21st-century LGBT people